Desamangalam  is a village in Thrissur district which located in the state of Kerala, India.

Demographics
 India census, Desamangalam had a population of 8446 with 4034 males and 4412 females.

Geography
Desamangalam is a small village surrounded by Shoranur in the east, Kunnamkulam in the west, Pattambi in the north and Wadakkancherry in the south. It is around 12 kilometers away from Shoranur, on the Shoranur-Guruvayur Road, Shoranur being one of the important railway junctions of Southern Railway.It is situated on the banks of Bharathappuzha.

History
Desamangalam was known for "mana", the residence of "Nambuthiries", the Brahmin community of Kerala, who were traditionally temple priests, but were the landlords and local rulers. Kerala was divided into three parts with Malabar comprising districts like Palakkad, Kozhikode, Malappuram, Kannur and Kasarkode. The central Kerala with districts like Trichur, Ernakulam formed the Cochin area and was under the direct rule of the Cochin Royals. Malabar rulers were known as Zamorins. Travancore region consists of sdistricts south of Ernakulam like Alleppey, Kottayam, Kollam (Quilon) and Trivandrum. Nairs is the majority community in Desamangalam and all faiths coexist without any cast or religious feelings.

Desamangalam Government VH School
The Government High School at Desamangalam was established in 1913. It became a High School in 1967 with the first SSLC batch passing out in 1967. Later the school was converted to a Vocational Higher secondary School.

Economy
Desamangalam Service co operative Society (renamed Bank) is another institution which has been in the forefront of service to the local population. Mahila Samajam is the third social and community set up in Desamangalam. There is a "Grameena Vayanasala" (Village library) which caters to the intellectual pursuits of the local community.

Art and culture

Desamangalam is known for various art forms. Thai Pooyam, Desamangalam pooram etc. are well known. "Chozhi kettu" is another art form unique to Desamangalam and surrounding places like Arangottukara, Pallam, kondayur, Pallur etc.

Tourism
Desamangalam is a scenic beauty which has been the home for many Malayalam movie shoots like Padmarajan. Bharathan, Dennis Joseph and Suhasini Maniratnam for the movies like Adharvam, Keli (film), Njan Gandharvan and Indira (film). Many actors like Prem Nazir, Sheela, Mammootty Mohanlal were used to visit the place several times during their film shoot. It is proud of its rich cultural heritage and peaceful coexistence of various religions and faiths for decades.

References

https://web.archive.org/web/20110814124916/http://desamangalam.webs.com/

Villages in Thrissur district